Sunden is a locality situated in Trosa Municipality, Södermanland County, Sweden with 329 inhabitants in 2010.

Notable people
Verner Lindberg, Finnish senator

References 

Populated places in Södermanland County
Populated places in Trosa Municipality